Illuminati is the fourteenth studio album by the melodic hard rock band Ten. The album was released on the 9th of November 2018. As with the previous studio album of the band, the album cover was again illustrated by Stan W. Decker. The first single of the album, the track "Jericho", was released in September 19. On the day of the release of the album, the band also released a new music video/single for the track "The Esoteric Ocean". The album proved to be yet another successful release for the band, reaching the 26th position on BBC's Rock Albums Charts and also breaking into the top Billboard Top Hard Rock Albums Charts, on the 83rd position.

Track listing
All songs written by Gary Hughes.
 Be as You Are Forever – 8:04
 Shield Wall – 5:39
 The Esoteric Ocean – 5:05
 Jericho – 5:47
 Rosetta Stone – 6:14
 Illuminati – 5:42
 Heaven and the Holier-Than-Thou – 5:28
 Exile – 5:16
 Mephistopheles – 5:13
 Of Battles Lost and Won – 5:45
 Rosetta Stone (remix) (Japanese Bonus Track) – 4:00

Personnel

Ten
Gary Hughes – vocals, guitars, backing vocals
Dann Rosingana – lead guitars
Steve Grocott – lead guitars
John Halliwell – rhythm guitars
Darrel Treece-Birch – keyboards, programming
Steve Mckenna – bass guitar
Max Yates – drums and percussion

Production
Gary Hughes – production

Chart positions

References

Ten (band) albums
2018 albums